Acrylonitrile styrene acrylate (ASA), also called acrylic styrene acrylonitrile, is an amorphous thermoplastic developed as an alternative to acrylonitrile butadiene styrene (ABS), but with improved weather resistance, and is widely used in the automotive industry.  It is an acrylate rubber-modified styrene acrylonitrile copolymer. It is used for general prototyping in 3D printing, where its UV resistance and mechanical properties make it an excellent material for use in fused deposition modelling printers.

Properties
ASA is structurally very similar to ABS. The spherical particles of slightly crosslinked acrylate rubber (instead of butadiene rubber), functioning as an impact modifier, are chemically grafted with styrene-acrylonitrile copolymer chains, and embedded in styrene-acrylonitrile matrix. The acrylate rubber differs from the butadiene based rubber by absence of double bonds, which gives the material about ten times the weathering resistance and resistance to ultraviolet radiation of ABS, higher long-term heat resistance, and better chemical resistance. ASA is significantly more resistant to environmental stress cracking than ABS, especially to alcohols and many cleaning agents. n-Butyl acrylate rubber is usually used, but other esters can be encountered too, e.g. ethyl hexyl acrylate. ASA has lower glass transition temperature than ABS, 100 °C vs 105 °C, providing better low-temperature properties to the material.

ASA has high outdoor weatherability; it retains gloss, color, and mechanical properties in outdoor exposure. It has good chemical and heat resistance, high gloss, good antistatic properties, and is tough and rigid. It is used in applications requiring weatherability, e.g. commercial siding, outside parts of vehicles, or outdoor furniture.

ASA is compatible with some other plastics, namely polyvinyl chloride and polycarbonate. ASA-PVC compounds are in use.

ASA can be processed by extrusion and coextrusion, thermoforming, injection molding, extrusion blow molding, and structural foam molding.

ASA is mildly hygroscopic; drying may be necessary before processing.

ASA exhibits low moulding shrinkage.

ASA can be used as an additive to other polymers, when their heat distortion (resulting in deformed parts made of the material) has to be lowered.

ASA can be coextruded with other polymers, so only the ASA layer is exposed to high temperature or weathering. ASA foils are used in in-mold decoration for forming e.g. car exterior panels.

ASA can be welded to itself or to some other plastics. Ultrasonic welding can be used to join ASA to PVC, ABS, SAN, PMMA, and some others.

ASA can be solvent-welded, using e.g. cyclohexane, 1,2-dichloroethane, methylene chloride, or 2-butanone. Such solvents can also join ASA with ABS and SAN. Solutions of ASA in these solvents can also be used as adhesives.

ASA can be glued with cyanoacrylates; uncured resin can however cause stress cracking. ASA is compatible with acrylic-based adhesives. Anaerobic adhesives perform poorly with ASA. Epoxies and neoprene adhesives can be used for bonding ASA with woods and metals.

Compared to polycarbonate, ASA has higher resistance to environmental stress cracking, and exhibits lower yellowing in outdoor applications. Compared to polypropylene, ASA has lower moulding shrinkage (0.5% vs 1.5%), higher stiffness, impact resistance, heat distortion temperature, and weatherability.

History
In the 1960s, James A. Herbig and Ival O. Salyer of Monsanto were the first to attempt to make what would become ASA using butyl acrylate as the rubber phase. This work was then refined by Hans-Werner Otto and Hans Peter Siebel of BASF using a copolymer of butyl acrylate with butadiene for the rubber phase.

Production
ASA can be made by either a reaction process of all three monomers (styrene, acrylonitrile, acrylic ester) or a graft process, although the graft process is the typical method. A grafted acrylic ester elastomer is introduced during the copolymerization of styrene and acrylonitrile. The elastomer is introduced as a powder.

As of 2003, there were only few large manufacturers of ASA; e.g. BASF, General Electric, Bayer, Miele, Hitachi, and LG Chem. The production process is similar to ABS, but it has some key differences and difficulties. The annual demand around 2003 was about 1-5% of ABS.

Applications
ASA/PC (polycarbonate) blends have been prepared and are commercially available. 

In the Fused Filament Fabrication 3-D printing process, the ASA filament is used to fabricate 3-D printed parts, which above all must absorb a certain amount of impact and impact energy without breaking.

ASA with compounds of silver, rendering its surface antimicrobial by the silver's oligodynamic effect, was introduced to the market in 2008.

References

Organic polymers
Fused filament fabrication